Derek Scott Jr. (born April 22, 1999) is an American professional stock car racing driver. He last competed part-time in the NASCAR Camping World Truck Series, driving the No. 02 for Young's Motorsports.

Scott started in kart racing when he was eight years old, and at the age of 14 he moved up to late models. In 2016, he made his Truck Series debut at Iowa Speedway.

Motorsports career results

NASCAR
(key) (Bold – Pole position awarded by qualifying time. Italics – Pole position earned by points standings or practice time. * – Most laps led.)

Camping World Truck Series

References

External links
 

1999 births
NASCAR drivers
Living people
People from Franklin, Texas
CARS Tour drivers
Racing drivers from Texas